Adrianna Płaczek (born 10 December 1993) is a Polish handball player for Nantes Atlantique Handball and the Polish national team.

She participated at the 2016 European Women's Handball Championship.

Achievements

Club

International 

 EHF European League:
 Winner : 2021 (with Nantes Atlantique Handball)

 EHF European Cup:
 Runner up: 2015 (with SPR Pogoń Szczecin)

Domestic 

 French Cup:
 Runner up: 2021 (with Nantes Atlantique Handball)

 Polish league:
 Runner up: 2016 (with SPR Pogoń Szczecin)

 Polish Cup (Puchar Polski):
 Runner up: 2016 (with SPR Pogoń Szczecin)

National team 
Carpathian Trophy:
Winner: 2017

Individual awards
 Carpathian Trophy Best Goalkeeper: 2017

References

External links

1993 births
Living people
Polish female handball players
People from Leszno
Sportspeople from Greater Poland Voivodeship
Expatriate handball players
Polish expatriate sportspeople in France
21st-century Polish women